Duncan Duff (born 1964 in Edinburgh, Scotland, UK) is a British stage, television and film actor who trained at the Royal Academy of Dramatic Art in London 1985 - 1987. He is best known for His role in Not Going out as Pete and for A Quiet Passion (2016), Wild Target (2010), Big Kids (2000), and Hamish Macbeth (1997).

Career

Duff made his professional stage debut in 1987 with the highly acclaimed British Theatre Company Cheek by Jowl, founded by Declan Donnellan and Nick Ormerod, in a chilling production of Macbeth at the Donmar Warehouse and on tour. He played the Thane of Angus and the cream faced loon, earning his Equity card and establishing himself as a prominent member of the company for the next four years. The following year he played Caliban in Cheek by Jowl’s The Tempest which opened at the Taormina Festival, Sicily, before playing to packed and appreciative audiences across the world. The most extraordinary venue was the Romanian National Theatre in Bucharest in the final year of the Ceausescu dictatorship where the play’s themes of enslavement and liberty were rapturously received and defiantly applauded by brave Romanians. The company were monitored by the Securitate, state police during their visit.

He also appeared in Cheek by Jowl’s productions of Philoctetes by Sophocles and Miss Sara Sampson by Gotthold Lessing. His fifth and final collaboration with the company was playing Horatio to Timothy Walker’s Hamlet in an internationally renowned production which played in London, UK, Europe, Hong Kong and Japan.

In 1992 Duff created the role of Willie Dobie in Scottish playwright Simon Donald’s vibrant new play, The Life of Stuff, at The Traverse Theatre in Edinburgh with Shirley Henderson, which earned him high critical praise. Duff also appeared in the British premiere of Physical Jerks at Alan Ayckbourn’s Stephen Joseph Theatre Scarborough, Life Goes On written by Adrian Hodges at The Haymarket Basingstoke, Three Sisters at Liverpool Everyman, Time and the Room at the Gate Theatre London and the eponymous role in Anatol by Arthur Schnitzler at Nottingham Playhouse. At the National Theatre, Duff played Bartolomeo Pergami in Nick Stafford’s new play Battle Royal directed by the brilliant Howard Davies starring Zoe Wanamaker and Simon Russell Beale. In 2002 he was Jason opposite Maureen Beattie’s Medea in Theatre Babel’s shattering production of Liz Lochhead’s adaptation of Medea at the Edinburgh Festival, Glasgow Citizens, then the incomparable open air Roman theatre on Cyprus the four metro centres of India and Toronto’s Harbour Front Theatre.

On television, Duff played the dope-smoking Doc Brown in the cult BBC 1 series Hamish Macbeth devised by Daniel Boyle and set in the Highlands of Scotland, co-starring with Robert Carlyle for three series (1995 - 1997). He starred as Geoff Spiller in the short-lived but popular BBC comedy Big Kids with Imogen Stubbs (2000). For two years Duff was nefarious property developer Lewis Cope in BBC Scotland’s BAFTA Award winning drama River City (2002 - 2004) set in Glasgow.

Duff has displayed the range of his acting ability in strong leading roles in many TV dramas such as: Why We Went To War (2006) playing Jonathan Powell; Roman Mysteries (2007) portraying the Emperor Domitian; the first season of cult TV show Skins (2007) playing evangelistic Congratulations Leader Pete; Purves & Pekkala (2009) AKA New Town by award-winning auteur director Annie Griffin playing highly strung architectural preservationist Ernst de Bont; the beleaguered Governor of Boulogne in The Tudors (2010); odious TV presenter Tom Sutherland in the provocative BBC series Lip Service (2010).

Duff has also displayed his comedic touch in sitcoms: May To December (1994), The Creatives (1998), Not Going Out (2008). He was the anchor Richard Pritchard co-starring with Sharon Horgan in Broken News (2005) by award-winning comedy writer John Morton for BBC and Gus Plotpoint in Charlie Brooker’s Touch of Cloth (2013) for Sky. In the cinema he has appeared in comedy roles in Carry On Columbus (1992), Festival (2005) directed by Annie Griffin, Wild Target (2010) directed by Jonathan Lynn, and Burke & Hare (2010) directed by comedy legend John Landis. Duff has appeared in dozens of short films, keen to collaborate with emerging talent in front of and behind the camera. Two of these films have been nominated for awards: King’s Christmas (1986) being BAFTA nominated and The Girls (2007) BIFA nominated.

Duff portrayed: Austin Dickinson, the brother of American poet Emily Dickinson, played brilliantly by Cynthia Nixon, in British auteur director Terence Davies’ A Quiet Passion (2016), exquisitely shot by Florian Hoffmeister; also starring Jennifer Ehle, Keith Carradine, Catherine Bailey, Joanna Bacon and Emma Bell; described by Richard Brody of The New Yorker as “an absolute drop-dead masterwork”. A Quiet Passion has been warmly received at Festivals around the world and opened to rhapsodic reviews in the UK and US in April 2017.

Filmography

External links

1964 births
Living people
Alumni of the University of Liverpool
Male actors from Edinburgh
Alumni of RADA
Scottish male stage actors
Scottish male television actors
Scottish male film actors